Henry Wriothesley (pronounced Risley) may refer to:

Henry Wriothesley, 2nd Earl of Southampton (1545-1581)
Henry Wriothesley, 3rd Earl of Southampton (1573-1624), patron of William Shakespeare